Diachrysia is a genus of moths of the family Noctuidae.

Species
 Diachrysia aereoides Grote, 1864
 Diachrysia balluca Geyer, 1832
 Diachrysia bieti Oberthür, 1884
 Diachrysia chrysitis – burnished brass Linnaeus, 1758
 Diachrysia chryson – scarce burnished brass Esper, 1789
 Diachrysia coreae Bryk, 1949
 Diachrysia generosa Staudinger, 1900
 Diachrysia leonina Oberthür, 1884
 Diachrysia nadeja Oberthür, 1880
 Diachrysia stenochrysis Warren, 1913
 Diachrysia zosimi Hübner, [1822]

References
 Diachrysia at Markku Savela's Lepidoptera and Some Other Life Forms
 Natural History Museum Lepidoptera genus database

Plusiinae
Taxa named by Jacob Hübner